Shades of Love can mean:

 Shades of Love (film series) – a series of made-for-television movies
 Shades of Love (band) – dance-music group in which Meli'sa Morgan sang
Shades of Love (album) a 1977 album by Walt Dickerson